San Marino (SMR) competed at the 2005 Mediterranean Games in Almería, Spain. The nation had a total number of 33 participants (28 men and 5 women).

Medal

Silver
 Shooting
Women's Trap: Daniela Del Din

Results by event
 Beach Volleyball
Men's Competition 
Alfredo Tabarini and Francesco Tabarini

 Bowls
Men's doubles 
Fernando Chiaruzzi
Alfredo Mazza

Men's Triples 
Corrado Albani
Fernando Chiaruzzi
Alfredo Mazza

 Equestrian
Individual Jumping 
Tommaso Lonfernini

 Golf
Men's Individual
Fabio Grossi

 Shooting
Men's 10m Air Pistol
Mirko Bugli

Men's 50m Rifle Prone
Federico Volpini

Men's Skeet
Moreno Benedettini

Men's Trap
Francesco Amici
Alfio Tomassoni

Men's Double Trap
Maurizio Zonzini

Women's 10m Air Pistol
Nadia Marchi

Women's 10m Air Rifle
Erika Ghiotti

Women's Trap
Daniela Del Din
Emanuela Felici

 Swimming
Men's 100m Freestyle
 Emanuele Nicolini

Men's 200m Freestyle
 Emanuele Nicolini

Men's 400m Freestyle
 Emanuele Nicolini

Men's 1500m Freestyle
 Emanuele Nicolini

Men's 200m Butterfly
 Emanuele Nicolini

Women's 100m Freestyle
 Simona Muccioli

Women's 400m Freestyle
 Simona Muccioli

Women's 800m Freestyle
 Simona Muccioli

Women's 200m Butterfly
 Simona Muccioli

 Tennis
Men's singles
William Forcellini
Domenico Vicini

Men's doubles
William Forcellini and Domenico Vicini

 Volleyball
Men's Team Competition
Luca de Luigi 
Alessandro Della Balda 
Leonardo Gennari 
Simone Giorgetti
Valerio Guagnelli 
Elia Lazzarini 
Enrico Morganti
Davide Righi
Ivan Stefanelli 
Francesco Tabarini
Davide Tini  
Lino Zonzini

See also
 San Marino at the 2004 Summer Olympics
 San Marino at the 2008 Summer Olympics

References
 Official Site
 juegosmediterraneos

Nations at the 2005 Mediterranean Games
2005
Mediterranean Games